Hugh Robert Overholt (born October 29, 1933) is a retired major general in the United States Army. Overholt served as Deputy Judge Advocate General of the United States Army from 1981 to 1985 before serving as Judge Advocate General of the United States Army from 1985 to 1989. He attended the University of Arkansas, earning a B.A. degree in classics in 1955 and an LL.B. degree in 1957.

References

1933 births
Living people
People from Beebe, Arkansas
University of Arkansas alumni
University of Arkansas School of Law alumni
Arkansas lawyers
Recipients of the Legion of Merit
United States Army generals
Judge Advocates General of the United States Army